Dickey Mountain is a mountain in Thornton, New Hampshire, United States. The mountain has an exposed summit which is accessible via the Welch-Dickey trail, a  loop which also crosses Welch Mountain. It is one of five places in New Hampshire which is home to the jack pine.

References 

Mountains of Grafton County, New Hampshire
Tourist attractions in Grafton County, New Hampshire